Lorraine Dunn (later Davis, 12 September 1942 – 16 October 2003) was a Panamanian sprinter and hurdler. She competed in the 4 × 100 metres relay at the 1960 Summer Olympics and the 1964 Summer Olympics as well as the 80 metres hurdles in 1964. Dunn finished third in the 200 metres with a time of 24.7 seconds and finished fourth in the 80 metres hurdles at the 1963 Pan American Games. Dunn's international breakthrough came when she won a gold medal in the 4 x 100 metres relay at the 1959 Central American and Caribbean Games as a 16-year old. She also won a silver medal in the 80 metres hurdles and a bronze in the 4 x 100 metres relay at the 1962 Central American and Caribbean Games.

Early life
Dunn was born in Panama City into a family of accomplished athletes. Her father was a competitive weightlifter before becoming an accountant for the Panama Canal, and her aunt Josephine Lewis Sampson held many of the country's records in hurdles (these records were in turn later broken by Dunn).

In 1960, Dunn, along with her relay teammates Silvia Hunte, Carlota Gooden and Jean Holmes-Mitchell, were the first female athletes to represent Panama at the Olympics. They set a Panamanian 4 x 100 metres women's relay record of 46.66 seconds that was not equalled until 2013.

After she graduated from high school in 1961, Wilma Rudolph's coach, the legendary Ed Temple, offered her a track scholarship to train under him at Tennessee State University. She competed for the powerhouse TSU Tigerbelles and graduated from Tennessee State with honours in 1965. The Tigerbelles dominated US women's track and field during this era. In fact, from 1960 to 1968 they did not lose an AAU National Championship and won nearly every single competitive team meet they participated in during those years.

In February 1964, Dunn, along with Wyomia Tyus, Vivian Brown and Edith McGuire, was on the Tigerbelles relay team that set an indoor world record of 47.5 seconds in the 440 yard relay at the Mason-Dixon Games at Freedom Hall, Louisville. Previously, TSU held the old world mark of 48.3 seconds.

Olympics and beyond
At the opening ceremony of the 1964 Summer Olympics, Dunn served as the Panamanian flag bearer.

In her final year at TSU, Dunn was a member of the women's track and field team that won the AAU National Indoor Championships at Madison Square Garden, New York City. Dunn, Tyus, McGuire and Essie Crews made up the 640 yard relay team which won the event in a time of 1:11.7 after running a heat in a record-breaking 1:11.5.

After retiring from competitive athletics, Dunn settled in Peoria, Illinois and worked as an accountant for Caterpillar and Pabst Brewing Company.

In 1974, she briefly coached the University of Kansas women’s cross-country and track teams.

Soon after, she moved to Fairfax County, Virginia and worked as an accountant for the National Bar Association. She was a member of the Northern Virginia chapter of the Delta Sigma Theta service sorority and past president of its educational and community service foundation. Dunn was past treasurer of both the Fairfax County Committee of 100 and the Fairfax County-wide PTA; a member of the Williamsburg Manor Civic Association; the Urban League; the NAACP; the Northern Virginia League of Women Voters; and St. Joseph's Catholic Church in Alexandria.

On 13 January 2000, in a statement which appeared in the newspaper El Siglo, the then-President of Panama, Mireya Moscoso, expressed her sincere appreciation to all Panamanian athletes who throughout the 20th century gave all of their effort to honour the country, nationally and internationally. Lorraine Dunn was among those athletes mentioned by name, along with the likes of Roberto Durán, Rod Carew and Lloyd LaBeach.

Dunn died of a heart attack in 2003. Survivors include her husband, John Davis of Alexandria; a daughter, Aisha Davis of Washington; a son, Kiilu Davis of Scottsdale; a sister, Lydia Harris; and two grandsons and a granddaughter. She was preceded in death by her youngest sister, Raquel Octavia Dunn.

References

External links
 

1942 births
2003 deaths
Athletes (track and field) at the 1960 Summer Olympics
Athletes (track and field) at the 1964 Summer Olympics
Panamanian female sprinters
Panamanian female hurdlers
Olympic athletes of Panama
Athletes (track and field) at the 1959 Pan American Games
Athletes (track and field) at the 1963 Pan American Games
Pan American Games bronze medalists for Panama
Pan American Games medalists in athletics (track and field)
Competitors at the 1959 Central American and Caribbean Games
Competitors at the 1962 Central American and Caribbean Games
Central American and Caribbean Games gold medalists for Panama
Central American and Caribbean Games silver medalists for Panama
Central American and Caribbean Games bronze medalists for Panama
Sportspeople from Panama City
Tennessee State Lady Tigers track and field athletes
Panamanian emigrants to the United States
Panamanian Roman Catholics
African-American Catholics
Kansas Jayhawks track and field coaches
Kansas Jayhawks cross country coaches
Central American and Caribbean Games medalists in athletics
National Bar Association
Medalists at the 1963 Pan American Games
20th-century African-American women
20th-century African-American people